The following is a list of Deadly 60 episodes.

Series 1 (2009)

Series 2 (2010)

Series 3 (2012)

Series 4 (2020) 
On 17 February 2020, Steve Backshall announced on social media that the fourth season of Deadly 60 was coming on CBBC a week later.

References 

Deadly 60